United Nations Security Council resolution 1266, adopted unanimously on 4 October 1999, after recalling all previous resolutions on Iraq, including resolutions 986 (1995), 1111 (1997), 1129 (1997), 1143 (1997), 1153 (1998), 1175 (1998), 1210 (1998) and 1242 (1999) concerning the Oil-for-Food Programme, the Council increased the limit on the amount of oil Iraq could export to 3.04 billion United States dollars for the current 180-day period which began on 25 May 1999.

The Security Council was determined to improve the humanitarian situation in Iraq and, acting under Chapter VII of the United Nations Charter, increased the limit of oil that Iraq could export beyond the prior authorised limit, which had previously been US$5.26 billion within a 180-day period.

See also
 Foreign relations of Iraq
 Gulf War
 Invasion of Kuwait
 Sanctions against Iraq
 List of United Nations Security Council Resolutions 1201 to 1300 (1998–2000)

References

External links
 
Text of the Resolution at undocs.org

 1266
1999 in Iraq
 1266
October 1999 events